South Korean boy band Big Bang have released three Korean-language studio albums, five Japanese-language studio albums, five Korean EPs, two Japanese EPs, six Japanese compilations albums, 27 Korean singles, and eight Japanese singles. BigBang is known for composing and producing their own music, especially G-Dragon.

Group released songs

Solo released songs

G-Dragon

Taeyang

Daesung

Seungri

T.O.P

Sub-unit released songs

See also
Big Bang discography
List of awards and nominations received by Big Bang

Notes

References

 
Big Bang